All Saints Church is a Church of England parish church in Woodford Wells, London.

History
Population expansion in the area had led the ancient parish church of St Mary's Church, Woodford to build All Saints, which opened in 1874 and was designed by F. E. C. Streatfeild. A north aisle was added in 1876 and a choir vestry in 1885.

In 1875 All Saints was granted a consolidated chapelry using parts of the parishes of St Mary's and St Peter-in-the-Forest, Walthamstow, and in 1906 it became a parish of its own.

Present day
In 1979, the church was designated a Grade II listed building. All Saints stands in the Charismatic evangelical tradition of the Church of England.

References

Woodford Wells
Woodford Wells